Connecticut's 31st State Senate district elects one member of the Connecticut State Senate. It consists of the communities of Bristol, Plainville, Plymouth, Thomaston, and part of Harwinton. It has been represented by Republican Henri Martin since 2015.

Recent elections

2020

2018

2016

2014

2012

References

31